N.S. Bienstock, Inc. is a large television talent agency in the United States, representing more than 600 television personalities.  Ranked among the Top 10 of TV's most powerful, the group represents clients ranging from Dan Rather and Chris Matthews to Anderson Cooper and Bill O'Reilly.

Bienstock is a specialized agency, with most assets devoted to news and reality-based programming. Variety claims the company has a "virtual monopoly on the news biz's biggest stars" and the president of MSNBC told the New York Times that, ''They have a disproportionate share of America's news talent.
United Talent Agency acquired N.S. Bienstock on 22nd Jan 2014."

History
The company began in the 1940s as the small, New York City life insurance business of Nate Bienstock, whose client list included a number of journalists, including Walter Cronkite, Charles Collingwood and Eric Sevareid. He sold a policy to the author John Steinbeck, who had Richard Leibner's father, Sol, as an accountant. Mr. Bienstock invited Sol Leibner into his business in 1964 and eventually sold out to him.

At the time, TV news was taking off, and Bienstock's newspaper and news agency clients were in demand at the networks. They asked for his help as they negotiated their contracts. Richard Leibner—not long out of New York University's business school—took up that part of the business and built it.

His wife and partner, Carole Cooper, whom he met on a blind date in 1962 and married in 1964, left her career as a producer of commercials to join the firm and become an agent in 1976. The firm also includes their sons, Adam and Jonathan.

Leibner is the face of the company, known for beginning the trend of big news salaries in the 1980s by playing the networks against one another and getting big deals for Dan Rather and Diane Sawyer. (The two now make more than $7 million and $10 million, respectively.) In the process, he has been accused of transforming journalists into something closer to Hollywood celebrities.

The agency has been at the forefront of the broadcast news business since 1964, pioneering representation of on-air and off-air talent in syndication, cable, reality television, and talk radio over the last 40+ years.  The group not only represents talent, but also pitches and packages some of the most popular programs on both television and radio.

The Radio Television Digital News Association administers a fellowship for young professional journalists endowed by N.S. Bienstock.

In 2014 N.S. Bienstock was acquired by United Talent Agency.

List of notable present and past clients 

 Dan Abrams
 Stephanie Abrams
 Jose Diaz-Balart 
 Glenn Beck
 Ed Bradley (deceased)
 Margaret Brennan
 Aaron Brown
 Campbell Brown
 Juju Chang
 Ti-Hua Chang
 Jane Clayson
 Lynnette Khalfani-Cox
 Anderson Cooper
 Katherine Creag (deceased)
 Phil Donahue
 Howard Fineman
 Jack Ford
 Michael Gargiulo
 Michael Gelman
 David Gregory
 Gail Kasper
 Steve Kroft
 Lars Larson
 Harvey Levin
 Steve Levy
 Tom Llamas
 Dave Malkoff
 Chris Matthews
 Jane Velez-Mitchell
 Natalie Morales
 Norah O'Donnell
 Pam Oliver
 Byron Pitts
 Dan Rather
 Bill O'Reilly
 Jeff Ranieri
 John Roberts
 Robin Roberts
 Thomas Roberts
 Andy Rooney
 Melissa Russo
 Diane Sawyer
 Bob Schieffer
 Bob Simon (deceased)
 Alison Stewart
 John Stossel
 David Ushery
 Paula Zahn

References

External links 
 

American companies established in 1964
Talent and literary agencies
Companies based in New York City
1964 establishments in New York City